Barilius huahinensis is a fish in genus Barilius of the family Cyprinidae.

References 

H
Fish described in 1934